Seshu Shankar, better known by his stage name Shakalaka Shankar, is an Indian actor who works in Telugu-language films. Known for his comic roles, Shankar is one of the highest paid Telugu film comedians in 2017.

Career 
Shankar dropped out of school in 10th standard and moved to Hyderabad in 2002 to pursue a career in films. Owing to lack of opportunities, he worked as painter for few years, and took up odd jobs in the film industry such as light-man and office boy.

Shankar got is first opportunity in Notebook (2007). He then went to feature in comedy show Jabardasth, where he gained recognition. Shankar subsequently moved on to films. In 2017, he starred in Anando Brahma which was a box office success. Regarding his role, a critic noted that "Shakalaka Shankar brings the house down when he mimics popular actors and their iconic dialogues to baffle the ghost".

He appeared in several comic roles before debuting as a lead actor with Shambho Shankara (2018). Later that year, he starred in Driver Ramudu, which is yet to release. He considers actor-politician Pawan Kalyan as his role model.

In 2020, Shankar played Ram Gopal Varma in the film Parannageevi. He is again reprising the role in Ram Gopal Varma's biopic. Two more films where Shankar appears in a lead role, Lord Grandfather and Bomma Adirindi - Dimma Tirigindi are also under production.

Personal life 
Shankar is born and brought up in Srikakulam district of Andhra Pradesh. In 2016, he married Parvathi.

Filmography

Television 
Jabardasth
Extra Jabardasth

Awards and nominations

References

External links 

Living people
Telugu male actors
Telugu comedians
Indian male film actors
Year of birth missing (living people)
People from Srikakulam district
Male actors from Andhra Pradesh
Indian male comedians